Denys is both a form of the given name Denis and a patronymic surname. Amongst others, it is a transliteration of the common Ukrainian name Денис. Closely related forms are Denijs and Dénys. Notable people with the name include:

Given name

Actors, artists, musicians, and writers
 Denijs van Alsloot (c.1570–c.1626), Flemish landscape and genre painter 
 Denys Arcand (born 1941), Canadian film director, screenwriter and producer
 Denys Baptiste (born 1969), English jazz musician
 Denys Blakeway, British television producer
 Denys Bouliane (born 1955), Canadian composer and conductor
 Denys Cazet (born 1938), French-American author
 Denys Cochin (1851–1922), French writer
 Denys Colomb de Daunant (1922–2006), French writer, poet, photographer and filmmaker,
 Denys Coop (1920–1981), British cinematographer
 Denys Corbet (1826–1909), Channel Islands poet and painter
 Denys Cowan (born 1961), African American comic book artist and television producer
 Denys Desjardins (born 1966), Canadian film director, screenwriter, cinematographer and teacher
 Denys Granier-Deferre (born 1949), French film director
 Denys Graham, Welsh actor
 Denys Irving (1944-1976), Welsh musician and filmmaker
 Denys de La Patellière (1921–2013), French film director and scriptwriter
 Denys Lasdun (1914–2001), English architect
 Denys Ovenden (born 1922), British illustrator and watercolourist
 Denys Pouncey (1906–1999), English cathedral organist
 Denys Puech (1854–1942), French sculptor
 Denys Rhodes (1919–1981), English novelist
 Denys Spittle (1920–2003), British architect
 Denys Val Baker (1917–1984), Cornish writer
 Denys Wortman (1887–1958), American painter, cartoonist and comic strip creator

Sportspeople
 Denys Aleksandrov (born 1992), Ukrainian footballer
 Denys Andriyenko (born 1980), Ukrainian footballer
 Dénys Bain (born 1993), French footballer
 Denys Balanyuk (born 1997), Ukrainian footballer
 Denys Barvinko (born 1994), Ukrainian footballer
 Denys Berinchyk (born 1985), Ukrainian boxer
 Denys Bezborodko (born 1994), Ukrainian footballer
 Denys Boyko (born 1988), Ukrainian footballer
 Denys Carnill (1926–2016), British field hockey player
 Denys Chamay (1941–2013), Swiss fencer
 Denys Dedechko (born 1987), Ukrainian footballer
 Denys Dobson (1880–1916), English rugby player
 Denys Dubrov (born 1989), Ukrainian swimmer
 Denys Filimonov (born 1971), Ukrainian footballer
 Denys Golaydo (born 1984), Ukrainian footballer
 Denys Halenkov (born 1995), Ukrainian footballer
 Denys Harmash (born 1990), Ukrainian footballer
 Denys Hill (1896–1971), English cricketer
 Denys Hobson (born 1951), South African cricketer
 Denys Holaydo (born 1984), Ukrainian-born Russian footballer
 Denys Hotfrid (born 1975), Ukrainian weightlifter
 Denys Kaliberda (born 1990), Ukrainian-born German footballer
 Denys Kamerylov (born 1989), Ukrainian sprint canoer
 Denys Kolchin (born 1977), Ukrainian footballer
 Denys Kostyuk (born 1982), Ukrainian road bicycle racer
 Denys Kovalenko (born 1991), Ukrainian sprint canoer
 Denys Kozhanov (born 1987), Ukrainian footballer
 Denys Kulakov (born 1986), Ukrainian footballer
 Denys Kushnirov (born 1992), Ukrainian sport shooter
 Denys Lukashov (born 1989), Ukrainian basketball player
 Denys Miroshnichenko (born 1994), Ukrainian footballer
 Denys Molchanov (born 1987), Ukrainian tennis player 
 Denijs Morkel (1906–1980), South African cricketer
 Denys Oliynyk (born 1987), Ukrainian footballer
 Denys Onyshchenko (born 1978), Ukrainian footballer
 Denys Ovsyannikov (born 1984), Ukrainian futsal player
 Denys Poyatsyka (born 1985), Ukrainian boxer
 Denys Rebryk (born 1985), Ukrainian footballer
 Denys Rylsky (born 1989), Ukrainian footballer
 Denys Shcherbakov (born 1988), Ukrainian orienteering competitor
 Denys Shelikhov (born 1989), Ukrainian football goalkeeper
 Denys Skepskyi (born 1987), Ukrainian footballer
 Denys Smirnov (born 1975), Ukrainian footballer
 Denys Smith (1924–2016), British racehorse trainer
 Denys Sokolovskyi (born 1979), Ukrainian footballer
 Denys Solonenko (born 1992), Ukrainian boxer
 Denys Stoyan (born 1981), Ukrainian footballer
 Denys Sydorenko (born 1989), Ukrainian football goalkeeper
 Denys Sylantyev (born 1976), Ukrainian swimmer and politician
 Denys Syzonenko (born 1984), Ukrainian swimmer
 Denys Tourtchenkov (born 1978), Russian sprint canoer 
 Denys Vasilyev (born 1987), Ukrainian footballer
 Denys Vasin (born 1989), Ukrainian footballer
 Denys Wilcox (1910–1953), English cricketer and schoolmaster
 Denys Yanchuk (born 1988), Ukrainian footballer
 Denys Yurchenko (born 1978), Ukrainian pole vaulter
 Denys Zavhorodnyy (born 1979), Ukrainian swimmer

Other
 Denys Corbett Wilson (1882–1915), Irish pioneer aviator
 Denys Finch Hatton (1887–1931), English big-game hunter and lover of Karen Blixen
 Denys Fisher (1918–2002), English engineer and board game designer
 Denys Gaith (1910–1986), Syrian Melkite Greek Cat—holic bishop
 Denys Hay (1915–1994), Scottish historian
 Denys Henderson (born 1932), Scottish solicitor
 Denys Janot (fl. 1529–1544), French printer and bookseller
 Denys Johnson-Davies (born 1922), Canadian Arabic-to-English translator
 Denys van Leeuwen (1402–1471), Flemish theologian and mystic
 Denys Lombard (1938–1998), French historian and Sinologist
 Denys R. Martin (1892–1970), British philatelist
 Denys Page (1908–1978), British classical scholar
 Denys Panasyuk (1900–1984), Ukrainian Soviet lawyer and politician
 Denys Campion Potts (1923–2016), English academic whose subject was French literature
 Denys Rayner (1908–1967), British Royal Navy officer
 Denys Roberts (1921–2013), British Colonial Secretary of Hong Kong
 Denys Rolle (1614–1638), Sheriff of Devon
 Denys Rolle (1725–1797), British politician and landowner of Devon
 Denys Shortt,  British businessman
 Denys Sutton (1917–1991), British art critic and historian
 Denys Turner (born 1942), British academic
 Denys Watkins-Pitchford (1905–1990), British author, illustrator and countryman
 Denys Whitehorn Reid (1897–1970), officer in the British Army
 Denys Wilkinson (1922–2016), British nuclear physicist
 Denys Williams (1929–2014), Chief Justice of Barbados
 Denys Winstanley (1877-1947), British
″Denys 777

Surname
 André Denys (1948–2013), Belgian politician
 Ewout Denys (born 1987), Belgian footballer
 Frans Denys (c. 1610–1670), Flemish Baroque painter
 Jacob Denys (1644–1708), Flemish Baroque painter
 Jean-Baptiste Denys (c. 1640–1704), French physician
 Nicolas Denys (c. 1598–1688), French explorer, colonizer, soldier and leader
 Peter Denys (1760-1816), British landowner
 Pierre Denys, French physician, discovered Denys-Drash syndrome
 Pierre Denys de Montfort (1766–1820), French naturalist 
 Simon-Pierre Denys de Bonaventure (1659–1711), French Governor of Acadia 
 Thomas Denys (c.1477–1561), Sheriff and MP for Devon

See also
 Denis (disambiguation)
 Dennis
 Dennys (disambiguation)
 De Nijs (surname)
 Denys-Drash
 St Denys

Ukrainian masculine given names